Daniel Nocke is a German screenwriter for film and television, and a director of animated shorts. He frequently works with director Stefan Krohmer on live action projects. His films have been shown at German and American film festivals and his animations have been featured on the American public television series The Short List.

Filmography

Screenwriter
 Macht man eigentlich anders (1998, TV short)
 Barracuda Dancing (1999, TV movie)
 Celebrity Deathmatch Hits Germany (2001, TV series, Episode #1.1)
  (2001, TV movie)
  (2003)
 Familienkreise (2003, TV movie)
 Scheidungsopfer Mann (2004, TV movie)
 A Dead Brother (2005, TV movie)
  (2006, TV movie)
 Summer '04 (2006)
  (2007, TV movie)
 Die Katze (2007, TV movie)
 Mitte 30 (2007, TV movie)
  (2009, TV movie)
  (2009, TV movie)
 Der verlorene Vater (2010, TV movie)
 Die fremde Familie (2011, TV movie)
 Tatort (2010–2011, TV series, Das Dorf, Borowski und der vierte Mann)

Director and Screenwriter
 Der Peitschenmeister (1998, TV movie)
 Die Trösterkrise (1999)
 The Modern Cyclops (2002, short)
 No Room for Gerold (2006, short)
 12 Jahre (2010, short)

References

External links

Mass media people from Hamburg
Living people
Year of birth missing (living people)